Frederick William Mackey Holliday (February 22, 1828May 29, 1899) was a member of the Confederate Congress as well as an officer in the Confederate States Army during the American Civil War. He also became the 38th Governor of Virginia, serving from 1878 to 1882.

Biography
Born in Winchester, Virginia, Holliday was the son of Dr. R.J. and Mary Catherine Taylor Holliday. He attended Winchester Academy and Yale University before earning degrees in philosophy, political economy, and law from the University of Virginia. He was the Commonwealth's Attorney for Frederick County, Virginia from 1861 to 1865.

When the American Civil War began, he was elected as first captain of the Mountain Rangers of Winchester, which became Company D of the 33rd Virginia Infantry Regiment. The unit was part of the Stonewall Brigade in the Army of Northern Virginia. During the Battle of Cedar Mountain, Holliday was wounded in his right arm, which had to be amputated. He resigned from the military as a colonel on March 1, 1864, and was elected to the Second Confederate Congress.

Holliday won the election for Governor of Virginia in 1877 as a Conservative Democrat unopposed. Holliday began his term by breaking the established tradition of small inauguration ceremonies for Virginia governors. His ceremony included parades, bands, cannons, and an inaugural speech to 10,000 people.

Holliday traveled the world after his term as governor. He died at his home in Winchester, Virginia, on May 29, 1899, and was buried in Mount Hebron Cemetery.

References

External links
A Guide to the Executive Papers of Governor Frederick W. M. Holliday, 1878–1881 at The Library of Virginia

Democratic Party governors of Virginia
Members of the Confederate House of Representatives from Virginia
Virginia lawyers
Stonewall Brigade
Politicians from Winchester, Virginia
American amputees
American politicians with disabilities
Confederate States Army officers
1899 deaths
1828 births
University of Virginia School of Law alumni
Yale University alumni
County and city Commonwealth's Attorneys in Virginia
19th-century American politicians
19th-century American lawyers
Burials at Mount Hebron Cemetery (Winchester, Virginia)